Retegno is a small town within the municipality of Fombio, Lombardy, Italy.

History
Retegno had been Imperial Baronia and a Fief of Trivulzio family.

External links
Retegno.it

Municipalities of the Province of Lodi